The 2016 Kerala Legislative Assembly election was held on 16 May 2016 to elect 140 MLAs to the 14th Kerala Legislative Assembly.  Voter turnout was 77.53%, up from 75.12% in the previous election. The result was declared on 19 May 2016. The Left Democratic Front (LDF), led by Communist Party of India (Marxist) (CPI(M)), won the election, defeating the incumbent United Democratic Front (UDF), led by the Indian National Congress (INC), which could only win 47 seats in the election. Pinarayi Vijayan was sworn in as the Chief Minister on 25 May.

Background 
The tenure of the members of the Legislative Assembly in the state was to end on 31 May 2016.
As per the voters list published on 14 January 2016, there were around 2.60 crore (26 million) eligible voters including 6.18 lakh (618,000) new voters in the age group 18–21. Elections to the 140-member assembly were held in 21,498 polling stations set up at 12,038 locations. There were 500 model polling stations. Systematic Voters' Education and Electoral Participation (SVEEP) programme was undertaken in Kerala to raise voter awareness.

2,065 Voter-verified paper audit trail (VVPAT) units were used by the Election Commission in 1,650 polling stations in 12 constituencies. VVPAT were not used in Idukki, Pathanamthitta, Wayanad and Kasaragod districts.
The Election Commission launched several mobile apps.

Parties and coalitions 
There are two major political coalitions in Kerala. The Left Democratic Front (LDF) is the coalition of the left-wing and far-left parties, led by the Communist Party of India (Marxist) (CPI(M)). The United Democratic Front (UDF) is the coalition of centrist and centre-left parties led by the Indian National Congress.

Left Democratic Front

United Democratic Front

National Democratic Alliance

Left United Front

Parties not in any Coalition

Opinion polls

Exit Polls

Election Day 
Voting took place on 16 May 2016 in all 140 Legislative Assembly Constituencies. The final turnout was 77.35%.

Results 

The Left Democratic Front won in a landslide in terms of seats, winning 91 out of 140 seats in the legislature. The incumbent UDF front was defeated and was reduced to 47 seats. The NDA, and independent P. C. George won one seat each.

By alliance

P.C. George, who contested as an independent candidate from Poonjar, joined the NDA on a later date.

By region

By district

Results by party

|-
! colspan="2" rowspan="2" |Parties and coalitions
! colspan="2" |Popular vote
! colspan="2" |Seats
|-
!Votes
!%
!Candidates
!Won
|-
|bgcolor=|
|Communist Party of India (Marxist)
|5,365,472
|26.7
|84
|59
|-
|bgcolor=#00BFFF|
|Indian National Congress
|4,794,793
|23.8
|87
|21
|-
|bgcolor=#FF9933|
|Bharatiya Janata Party
|2,129,726
|10.6
|98
|1
|-
|bgcolor=|
|Communist Party of India
|1,643,878
|8.2
|25
|19
|-
|bgcolor=|
|Indian Union Muslim League
|1,496,864
|7.4
|23
|18
|-
|bgcolor=|
|Kerala Congress (Mani)
|807,718
|4.0
|15
|5
|-
|bgcolor=|
|Bharath Dharma Jana Sena
|795,797
|4.0
|36
|0
|-
|bgcolor=|
|Independents(LDF)
|487,510
|2.4
|8
|4
|-
|bgcolor=|
|Janata Dal (United)
|296,585
|1.5
|7
|0
|-
|bgcolor=|
|Janata Dal (Secular)
|293,274
|1.5
|5
|3
|-
|bgcolor=|
|Nationalist Congress Party
|237,408
|1.2
|4
|2
|-
|bgcolor=|
|Independents (IND)
|220,797
|1.1
|420
|1
|-
|bgcolor=|
|Revolutionary Socialist Party
|216,071
|1.1
|5
|0
|-
|bgcolor=|
|Kerala Congress (Democratic)
|157,584
|0.78
|4
|0
|-
|bgcolor=|
|National Secular Conference
|130,843
|0.65
|2
|1
|-
|bgcolor=|
|Revolutionary Socialist Party (Leninist)
|75,725
|0.38
|1
|1
|-
|bgcolor=|
|Kerala Congress (Balakrishna Pillai)
|74,429
|0.37
|1
|1
|-
|bgcolor=|
|Kerala Congress (Jacob)
|73,770
|0.37
|1
|1
|-
|bgcolor=|
|Communist Marxist Party (Aravindakshan)
|64,666
|0.32
|1
|1
|-
|bgcolor=|
|Congress (Secular)
|54,347
|0.27
|1
|1
|-
| colspan="2" |Total
|20,232,718	||100.00||1,203||	140	
|-
! colspan="9" |
|-
| style="text-align:left;" colspan="2" |Valid votes
| align="right" |20,232,718
| align="right" |99.97
| colspan="4" rowspan="5" style="background-color:#E9E9E9"  |
|-
| style="text-align:left;" colspan="2" |Invalid votes
| align="right" |6,107
| align="right" |0.03
|-
| style="text-align:left;" colspan="2" |Votes cast / turnout
| align="right" |20,238,825
| align="right" |77.53
|-
| style="text-align:left;" colspan="2" |Abstentions
| align="right" |5,866,244
| align="right" |22.47
|-
| style="text-align:left;" colspan="2" |Registered voters
| align="right" | 26,105,069
|colspan="1" style="background-color:#E9E9E9"|
|-
|}

By constituency 

Notable performances of other candidates

01.P.C.George  won from Poonjar Contituency with a margion 27821 votes

By-elections 
 2019 Kerala Legislative Assembly by-elections

No by-election is conducted for Kuttanad and Chavara

Assembly seat sharing post - bye election results:

See also
2015 Kerala local body elections
2020 Kerala local body elections

References

External links
Chief Electoral Officer,Kerala
Election Commission of India
Kerala Assembly Election 2016 Results 
UDF Kerala
LDF Keralam
NDA Kerala

Kerala
2016
2016